A. F. Hassan Ariff is a Bangladeshi lawyer, former Attorney General of Bangladesh and Advisor of Caretaker Government led by Fakhruddin Ahmed.

Career
Ariff was the Attorney General for Bangladesh from October 2001 to 28 April 2005. He resigned from his post reportedly over his failure to support pro-Bangladesh Nationalist Party lawyers in the Supreme Court Bar Association and Bangladesh Bar Council's cancellation of the license of a pro-BNP Bangladesh High Court judge who used fraudulent credentials. He founded AF Hassan Ariff & Associates in the 1970s. From January 2008 to January 2009 he was Law Adviser to the Caretaker Government.

References

Attorneys General of Bangladesh
Living people
Advisors of Caretaker Government of Bangladesh
Year of birth missing (living people)